Josep Maria Esquirol Calaf (born 1963, Mediona) is a Catalan philosopher, essayist and professor of philosophy at the University of Barcelona. He directs the Aporia Research Group, whose field of study is contemporary philosophy and, specifically, the relationship between philosophy and psychiatry.

He is also the author of several books recognized in this field, which shape his philosophical proposal; it is remarkable The intimate resistance (2015), which won the Ciutat de Barcelona Prize and also the National Essay Prize of the Spanish Ministry of Education, Culture and Sports. Others of his most notable books are La penúltima bondad: Ensayo sobre la vida humana (2018), Los filósofos contemporáneos y la técnica. De Ortega a Sloterdijk (2011), El respirar de los días (2010), El Respeto o la mirada atenta (2006) and Uno mismo y los otros. De las experiencias existenciales a la interculturalidad (2005).

Thought 
Josep Maria Esquirol has drawn up his own philosophical proposal, which he designates as a “philosophy of proximity”. It consists of a philosophical anthropology with both Socratic and Franciscan resonances. Also, it remains in constant dialogue with contemporary thought, while it is expressed in a language very close to the experience.

The works that build this philosophical approach have received several awards, and some of them are also being published in Italian, Portuguese, English and German.

Works 

 Raó i fonament, Barcelona, PPU, 1988. 
 Responsabilitat i món de la vida. Estudi sobre la fenomenologia husserliana, Barcelona, Anthropos, 1992. 
 D'Europa als homes, Barcelona, Cruïlla, 1994. 
 Tres ensayos de filosofía política, Barcelona, EUB, 1996. 
 La frivolidad política del final de la historia, Madrid, Caparrós, 1998. 
 Què és el personalisme? Introducció a la lectura d'Emmanuel Mounier, Barcelona, Pòrtic, 2001. 
 Uno mismo y los otros. De las experiencias existenciales a la interculturalidad, Barcelona, Herder, 2005. 
 El respeto o la mirada atenta, Barcelona, Gedisa, 2006. 
 El respirar dels dies, Barcelona, Paidós, 2009. 
 Los filósofos contemporáneos y la técnica. De Ortega a Sloterdijk, Barcelona, Gedisa, 2011. 
 La resistència íntima: Assaig d'una filosofia de la proximitat. Barcelona, Quaderns Crema, 2015. [4]
 La penúltima bondat: Assaig sobre la vida humana, Barcelona, Quaderns Crema, 2018. [5]
 Humà, més humà: Una antropologia de la ferida infinita, Quaderns Crema, 2021.

Translated works 

 Respeito ou o olhar atento. Uma ética para a era da ciencia e da tecnologia, Belo Horizonte, Autêntica Editora, 2008. 
 O respirar dos días. Uma refexão filosófica sobre a experiência do tempo, Belo Horizonte, Autêntica Editora, 2010. 
 La resistenza intima. Saggio su una filosofia della prossimità, Milano, Vita e Pensiero, 2018. 
 La penúltima bontà. Saggio sulla vita humana, Milano, Vita e Pensiero, 2019. 
 A Resistência Íntima. Essaio de uma filosofia da proximidade, Lisboa, Ediçoes 70, 2020. 
 Umano, più umano. Un’antropologia della ferita infinita, Milano, Vita e Pensiero, 2021.
 The Intimate Resistance. A Philosophy of proximity, Full d’Estampa, London, 2021. 
 Der intime Widerstand. Eine Philosophie der Nähe, Meiner Verlag, Hamburg, 2021.

Awards 
The author has won several awards: in 1993, he won the Essay Prize from the Joan Maragall Foundation for the book D’Europa als homes, while in 2015 he won a prize named "Ciutat de Barcelona Award" in the category of Essay, Social Sciences and Humanities for his book The intimate resistance. One year later, in 2016, Josep Maria Esquirol won the Spanish National Essay Prize, also for his work The intimate resistance.

References 

 

Academic staff of the University of Barcelona
21st-century Spanish philosophers
20th-century Spanish philosophers
1963 births
Living people